Sangmu Phoenix is a South Korean professional baseball team founded in 2005. The team is part of the Korea Armed Forces Athletic Corps, and they play in the KBO Futures League. Their home stadium is Sangmu Baseball Stadium located in Mungyeong.

Many professional players who are serving compulsory military service play for the Phoenix, usually for a term of two seasons. The team is not affiliated with any single KBO League team, but over its history has had a number of players from the Doosan Bears franchise.

The Sangmu Phoenix were champions of the Futures League's Southern League division in 2013, 2014, 2016, 2017, 2018, and 2019.

Current lineup
 This needs updating.

Notable former players

See also
 Sangju Sangmu FC
 Busan Sangmu WFC
 Korean Police Baseball Team

References 
Notes

Sources

Baseball teams in South Korea
Baseball teams established in 2005
2005 establishments in South Korea
Sport in Gyeonggi Province
Baseball
Military sports teams